Nina Đurđević (born 1991), is a Slovene model and beauty pageant titleholder. She was crowned titleholder of Miss Universe Slovenia 2013 and represented her country at the Miss Universe 2013 pageant.

Miss Universe Slovenia 2013
Nina was crowned as Miss Universe Slovenia 2013 and represented Slovenia in the Miss Universe 2013 in Moscow, Russia.

References

External links
Official Miss Universe Slovenia website

Living people
Slovenian beauty pageant winners
Miss Universe 2013 contestants
1991 births
Models from Maribor
Slovenian people of Serbian descent